Brookville Township may refer to the following townships in the United States:

 Brookville Township, Ogle County, Illinois
 Brookville Township, Franklin County, Indiana
 Brookville Township, Redwood County, Minnesota